The Sibiu Open is a tennis tournament held in Sibiu, Romania since 2012. In early 2012 it was announced that BRD – Groupe Société Générale will sponsor 4 Romanian ATP Challenger Tour tournaments with Sibiu chosen to host a brand new tournament, BRD Sibiu Challenger, as it was named prior to the 2013 change of sponsor. The event is part of the ATP Challenger Tour and is played on outdoor clay courts.

Past finals

Singles

Doubles

References

External links
Official site
Romanian Tennis Federation
ITF Search

 
ATP Challenger Tour
Tennis tournaments in Romania
Clay court tennis tournaments
Autumn events in Romania
Recurring sporting events established in 2012